The 1979 New Zealand bravery awards were announced via a Special Honours List on 11 April 1979, and recognised four people for acts of bravery in 1978.

Queen's Commendation for Brave Conduct
 James Aubrey Pierce – of Roxburgh; constable, New Zealand Police.

 Ian Richard Smith – of Russell; constable, New Zealand Police.

 Jean Susan Donnelly – of Masterton.

 Captain Peter William Nelson – Royal New Zealand Army Education Corps, Regular Force Cadet School, Waiouru.

References

Bravery
Bravery awards
New Zealand bravery awards